Rafael Berger (born 14 July 1986), commonly known as Rafael Alemão, is a Brazilian footballer who plays as a central defender for Criciúma.

Club career
On 12 December 2018, Alemão joined Série B side Figueirense from South Korean side Pohang Steelers on a contract until the end of 2020.

Honours
Ituano
Campeonato Paulista: 2014

Santa Cruz
Copa do Nordeste: 2016
Campeonato Pernambucano: 2015, 2016

Personal life

Rafael is married with Syusk Amorim Berger and they have an adolescent son, Rafael Júnior.

References

External links

1986 births
Living people
Brazilian people of German descent
Brazilian footballers
People from Vitória, Espírito Santo
Association football defenders
Marília Atlético Clube players
Mineiros Esporte Clube players
América Futebol Clube (SP) players
Campinense Clube players
Salgueiro Atlético Clube players
Clube Náutico Capibaribe players
Cuiabá Esporte Clube players
Ituano FC players
Esporte Clube Vitória players
Santa Cruz Futebol Clube players
Al-Faisaly FC players
Vila Nova Futebol Clube players
Pohang Steelers players
Figueirense FC players
Campeonato Brasileiro Série A players
Campeonato Brasileiro Série B players
Campeonato Brasileiro Série C players
Campeonato Brasileiro Série D players
K League 1 players
Saudi Professional League players
Brazilian expatriate footballers
Brazilian expatriate sportspeople in Saudi Arabia
Brazilian expatriate sportspeople in South Korea
Expatriate footballers in Saudi Arabia
Expatriate footballers in South Korea
Sportspeople from Espírito Santo